Ethology Ecology & Evolution is a bimonthly peer-reviewed scientific journal covering all aspects of the ecology, evolution or genetics of behaviour. It was established in 1890 as Monitore Zoologico Italiano, obtaining its current name in 1989, with volume numbering restarted at 1. It is published by Taylor & Francis and the editor-in-chief is Alberto Ugolini (University of Florence).

A brief history

The journal was established in 1890 by Giulio Chiarugi and Eugenio Ficalbi (who edited it until 1922) as the Monitore Zoologico Italiano. From the start, a specific interest is declared for zoology, anatomy, and embryology. The Unione Zoologica Italiana was founded in 1900 and in the same year the Monitore became its official journal. In 1923 Ficalbi was succeeded by Angelo Senna. From 1930 to 1933 the journal also became the official journal of the Società Italiana di Anatomia. Since 1934 it is no longer the organ of the Unione Zoologica Italiana and from 1934 to 1966 it is only the organ of the Società Italiana di Anatomia of which the proceedings of the conferences are published. Until 1943 it was edited by Chiarugi and Senna. In 1944 Giuseppe Colosi took over and edited the journal until 1967. In addition to Colosi, in 1946 Nello Beccari and Senna joined as editors. In 1951 Ignazio Fazzari replaced Senna. From 1957 on, the editors were Colosi, Fazzari, and Emanuele Padoa. In 1962 Leo Pardi also became part of the editorial committee.

In 1967, under the direction of Pardi, the Monitore was published every three months, in English, with the advice of an international advisory board and with the subtitle of Italian Journal of Zoology, and was mainly addressed to Zoology and Ethology. In 1967 the number of directors rises to 6 with the entry of Alberto Monroy and Floriano Papi. In 1968 and 1970 Valdo Mazzi and Baccio Baccetti join the editorial committee. In 1975, Colosi dies. In 1982, the directors are Pardi, Papi, Baccetti, Fazzari and Antonio Ercolini.

In 1985 Fazzari is no longer in the group of directors.
Since 1967, an annual Supplement of the Monitore has been published in relation to the development of zoology research in tropical areas (in particular Somalia following the foundation of the Centro di Studio per la Faunistica ed Ecologia Tropicali  del Consiglio Nazionale delle Ricerche, directed by Pardi) The publication of the Supplement lasted until 1987, becoming independent magazine since 1988, with the name of Tropical Zoology.
Starting from 1975 the Monitore Zoologico Italiano publishes a series of monographs focusing on themes of parasitology, herpetology, and ethology.

Since 1989 the Monitore becomes Ethology Ecology & Evolution, editor Francesco Dessì–Fulgheri. From 2010 it is published by Taylor & Francis. In 2015 Alberto Ugolini became editor-in-chief.

Founders and editors

Abstracting and indexing
The journal is abstracted and indexed in:

According to the Journal Citation Reports, the journal has a 2016 impact factor of 1.582.

References

External links

Taylor & Francis
Title. Monitore zoologico italiano

Ethology journals
Bimonthly journals
Taylor & Francis academic journals
English-language journals
Publications established in 1967